Michael Endres (born 1961) is a German pianist.

He was professor for piano from  1993 to 2004 at the Hochschule fuer Musik in Cologne, until 2009 at the Hochschule Hanns Eisler in Berlin—since autumn 2009  at the University of Canterbury in Christchurch, New Zealand until February 2014 and from March 2014 until 2018 at the Barratt Due Institute of Music in  Oslo, Norway. He resides currently in New Zealand.

Early life and training
He was born 1961 in Sonthofen in the Oberallgäu region of the Bavarian Alps and studied with Hugo Steurer, Klaus Schilde and Karl Hermann Mrongovius in Munich, then with Jacob Lateiner at the Juilliard School New York, where he received his master's degree - and later with Peter Feuchtwanger in London.

For many years, Michael Endres was the pianist to the late baritone Hermann Prey.

Repertoire
As well as specializing in Mozart, Schubert, Schumann and Ravel, he has a wide repertoire including the somewhat neglected composers Carl Maria von Weber, Leopold Godowsky, Gabriel Fauré, Sir Arnold Bax and Eduard Tubin. His comprehensive recordings include the complete sonatas of Franz Schubert, Wolfgang Amadeus Mozart, Carl Maria von Weber and Arnold Bax, the complete piano works of Maurice Ravel and George Gershwin as well as a complete recording of the 400 dances of Franz Schubert, the 48 Songs without Words by Felix Mendelssohn Bartholdy and 3 CDs of works by Robert Schumann. In March 2018 the 13 Barcarolles by Gabriel Faure were added to his discography. His recordings have received many prizes including Choc du Musique and Diapason d'Or and he has appeared at many major festivals and concert-halls around the world, such as the Salzburg Festival, Wigmore Hall London, Newport Festival, Wiener Musikverein and Suntory Hall, Tokyo.

Style
His playing is often described as subtle, elegant and refined regarding his recordings, where he does  not take the  dramatic elements of the music to the extreme. This  is more than compensated for by the insights that he brings and the remarkable clarity of his readings and playing. On the concert stage he often follows a riskier approach. The Boston Globe reviewer Richard Dyer described him as  following during his Newport Festival debut:
 "Endres has made an admirable series of records for Capriccio and Oehms Classics -- Mozart, Ravel, Weber, Schumann, and the finest recent account of the complete Schubert sonatas -- but the CDs don't begin to do him justice. They are poised, thoughtful, and expressive, but there is no hint of the wild-man risk-taking that marked his Newport recital. Endres took big chances, communicated how thrilling every dimension of the music was to him, and succeeded triumphantly against the odds."

Recordings
W.A. Mozart: Complete Sonatas for piano (5 CDs)- Arte Nova Classics - 74321 63639 2
Franz Schubert: Complete Sonatas for piano (6 CDs)
Franz Schubert: Complete dances (5 CDs)
Franz Schubert: Wandererfantasy and other works
Franz Schubert: Impromptus Opus 90 and Opus 142 
Carl Maria von Weber: Complete piano sonatas und other works (2 CDs)
Felix Mendelssohn Bartholdy: Lieder ohne Worte ( complete ) (2 CDs)
Robert Schumann: Piano works (3 CDs)
Arnold Bax : Complete Sonatas for piano (2 CDs)
Gabriel Faure: 13 Barcarolles 
Maurice Ravel: Complete piano works (2 CDs)
George Gershwin: Works for piano
Carl Loewe: Ballades (with Hermann Prey)
Franz Schubert & Johann:  W. Kalliwoda (with Ashan Pillai)

References

External links
 Michael Endres' website

1961 births
Living people
People from Sonthofen
German classical pianists
Male classical pianists
Juilliard School alumni
Academic staff of the University of Canterbury
Academic staff of the Barratt Due Institute of Music
21st-century classical pianists
Oehms Classics artists
21st-century male musicians
Academic staff of the Hochschule für Musik Hanns Eisler Berlin